In particle physics hexaquarks, alternatively known as sexaquarks, are a large family of hypothetical particles, each particle consisting of six quarks or antiquarks of any flavours. Six constituent quarks in any of several combinations could yield a colour charge of zero; for example a hexaquark might contain either six quarks, resembling two baryons bound together (a dibaryon), or three quarks and three antiquarks.  Once formed, dibaryons are predicted to be fairly stable by the standards of particle physics. 

A number of experiments have been suggested to detect dibaryon decays and interactions.  In the 1990s, several candidate dibaryon decays were observed but they were not confirmed.

There is a theory that strange particles such as hyperons and dibaryons could form in the interior of a neutron star, changing its mass–radius ratio in ways that might be detectable. Accordingly, measurements of neutron stars could set constraints on possible dibaryon properties. A large fraction of the neutrons in a neutron star could turn into hyperons and merge into dibaryons during the early part of its collapse into a black hole . These dibaryons would very quickly dissolve into quark–gluon plasma during the collapse, or go into some currently unknown state of matter.

D-star hexaquark
In 2014, a potential dibaryon was detected at the Jülich Research Center at about 2380 MeV. The center claimed that the measurements confirm results from 2011, via a more replicable method. The particle existed for 10−23 seconds and was named d*(2380). This particle is hypothesized to consist of three up and three down quarks, and has been proposed as a candidate for dark matter.

It is theorized that groups of d-star particles could form Bose–Einstein condensates due to prevailing low temperatures in the early universe, a state in which they overlap and blend together, a bit like the protons and neutrons inside atoms. Under the right conditions, BECs made of hexaquarks with trapped electrons could behave like dark matter. According to the researchers, this result indicates that during the earliest moments after the Big Bang, as the cosmos slowly cooled, stable d*(2830) hexaquarks could have formed alongside baryonic matter, and the production rate of this particle would have been sufficient to account for the 85% of the Universe's mass that is believed to be Dark Matter.

Critics say that even if it is possible to create a d* condensate as proposed, it cannot survive the intense radiation of the early Universe. Once they are blasted apart, there is no way to create more d* particles capable of forming a Bose-Einstein condensate, as the conditions that admit their creation will have passed.

H dibaryon
In 1977, Robert Jaffe proposed that a possibly stable H dibaryon with the quark composition udsuds could notionally result from the combination of two uds hyperons. It actually takes more than twice the age of the universe to decay. Data constrains the existence of such a particle, and it turns out that it is still allowed. As per one analysis, a hypothetical SU(3) flavor-singlet, highly symmetric, deeply bound neutral scalar hexaquark S=uuddss, which due to its features has escaped from experimental detection so far, may be considered as a candidate for a baryonic dark matter. However, existence of this state may contradict the stability of oxygen nuclei, necessitating further thorough analysis of it.

Others 

 In 2022 Riken researchers studied the existence of triply charmed dibaryon  concluding computationally that it should fall within a feasible regime.

See also
Exotic hadron
Deuteron, the only known stable composite particle that consists of six quarks.
Diproton, an extremely unstable dibaryon.
Dineutron, another extremely unstable dibaryon.
Pentaquark

References

Hypothetical composite particles
Baryons